is a party video game developed by Game Republic and published by Microsoft Game Studios. It was a Japanese launch title for the Xbox 360.

Gameplay
The game plays as a board game in which up to four players compete to be the first to reach a goal.  Each board features multiple routes, with some being shorter and riskier, while others are longer but potentially more lucrative in terms of prizes.  There are a number (30+) of different mini games which can be triggered during play, similar to the Mario Party series.

Before play begins, players select a character and customize the character with a variety of items and accessories unlocked during previous sessions.  When playing online via Xbox Live, this helps provide a unique appearance as compared to other players.

Roulette wheels

Movement is handled by spinning roulette wheels, although players actually collect the wheels themselves during the course of the game and pick which wheel to use each turn.  There are 37 different wheels, with different distributions of numbers, allowing some strategy in trying to get the desired number to come up.  Players can store up to five different roulette wheels at once.

Some roulette wheels contain star spaces.  If the wheel lands on one of these locations, the player is subjected to the bonus or penalty from the current square again.  While this can be helpful if on a particularly beneficial square, such spaces usually have little or no movement accompanying them, and so ultimately hinder progression towards the goal.

Medals
In addition to collecting roulette wheels, players also collect medals (frequently referred to as "coins", due to their resemblance to gold coins).  These medals are used as payment to pass certain obstacles, to avoid certain negative effects, or to make purchases (often of coveted roulette wheels).

Development
The characters in the game were designed by Japanese writer and manga artist Momoko Sakura, known for her work on Chibi Maruko-chan.

Reception
As the title was released only in Japan, most English language review sites previewed the game but neglected to perform a full review.  Positives which were highlighted included customizable online play and a unique artistic style.  Negative comments focused on long load times, dated graphics, and overly-simplistic mini games.

Japanese review scores:
 Weekly Famitsū: 30 out of 40 (75%)
 Famitsū Xbox 360: 24 out of 40 (60%)

References

External links
Official website 

2005 video games
Digital board games
Game Republic games
Japan-exclusive video games
Microsoft games
Multiplayer and single-player video games
Video games developed in Japan
Xbox 360 games
Xbox 360-only games